Gladstad is the administrative centre of the municipality of Vega in Nordland county, Norway. Vega Church is located in Gladstad.

Climate 
Gladstad has either a subarctic climate (Köppen climate classification: Dfc) when the 0°C isotherm is used, or a subpolar oceanic climate (Köppen climate classification: Cfc) when the -3°C isotherm is used. Summers are warm and winters are cold though. The village climate is mild compared to almost everywhere else at the same latitude, even on the coast of Alaska. In addition it has one of the rainiest European coastal climates with almost  of annual rainfall and reaching just under 2/3 of rainy days. The diurnal and annual variability of temperature is low but still its summer is hot for latitude and its mild winter. The temperatures during the winter afternoon are above 0°C. Cloudy weather is present for much of the year, especially in December. In the sunny months there is only on average 2 to 3 days with the sky completely open receiving sunlight.

References

Villages in Nordland
Vega, Norway